Etobicoke—Lakeshore (formerly known as Lakeshore and Toronto—Lakeshore) is a federal electoral district in Ontario, Canada, that has been represented in the House of Commons of Canada since 1968.

It covers the southern part of the Etobicoke portion of Toronto on the shore of Lake Ontario including the former 'Lakeshore Municipalities' of Mimico, New Toronto and Long Branch.

This riding has been a destination for Slavic immigrants. The percentage of native speakers of Slavic languages in this riding (primarily Polish, Ukrainian, Russian, Serbian, and Croatian) is 15.0%, the highest in Canada.

Demographics
According to the Canada 2021 Census

Ethnic groups: 63.9% White, 7.8% South Asian, 5.7% Black, 4.0% Chinese, 3.3% Latin American, 3.2% Filipino, 1.7% Korean, 1.5% Southeast Asian, 1.3% Indigenous, 1.3% Arab, 1.3% West Asian
Languages: 56.5% English, 3.6% Polish, 3.0% Spanish, 2.5% Ukrainian, 2.5% Portuguese, 2.1% Russian, 1.9% Italian, 1.5% Tagalog, 1.4% French, 1.3% Mandarin, 1.3% Tibetan, 1.3% Korean, 1.2% Serbian, 1.0% Arabic, 1.0% Cantonese
Religions: 55.2% Christian (32.1% Catholic, 5.3% Christian Orthodox, 3.1% Anglican, 2.6% United Church, 1.1% Presbyterian, 11.0% Other), 4.8% Muslim, 3.8% Hindu, 2.9% Buddhist, 31.2% None 
Median income: $47,600 (2020)

Average income: $71,100 (2020)

Geography
Consisting of that part of the City of Toronto described as follows: commencing at the intersection of the Humber River with Dundas Street West; thence southwesterly along said street to the Canadian Pacific Railway; thence southerly along said railway to Mimico Creek; thence generally westerly along said creek to Kipling Avenue; thence southerly along said avenue to Burnhamthorpe Road; thence westerly along said road to Highway 427; thence southerly along said highway to Dundas Street West; thence westerly along said street to the westerly limit of said city; thence generally southerly and northeasterly along the westerly and southerly limits of said city to the southeasterly production of the Humber River; thence generally northwesterly along said production and the Humber River to the point of commencement.

History
The riding was created in 1966 as "Lakeshore" from part of York—Humber, the same year the 'Lakeshore municipalities', Mimico, New Toronto, Long Branch were annexed to the new Borough of Etobicoke. In 1971, it was renamed "Toronto—Lakeshore". In 1976, it was abolished, and replaced by "Etobicoke—Lakeshore".

The riding was represented by federal Liberal Party and official Opposition leader Michael Ignatieff, who was first elected in 2006, until he was unseated in the 2011 General Election by Conservative Bernard Trottier. Trottier lost to James Maloney of the Liberals in 2015, and Maloney still holds the seat. It was previously represented by Jean Augustine.  Provincially, it was represented by Peter Milczyn from 2014 to 2018, and is now represented by Christine Hogarth.  On Toronto City Council, the riding is represented by Mark Grimes.

In the 1988 federal election, there was no Liberal candidate on the ballot because two days after nominations were due, the Liberal candidate, Emmanuel Feuerwerker, withdrew citing heart problems after the news media reported that Mr. Feuerwerker's campaign literature claimed university degrees that he did not, in fact, possess.

This riding lost territory to Etobicoke Centre during the 2012 electoral redistribution.

Former boundaries

Members of Parliament

This riding has elected the following Members of Parliament:

Election results

Etobicoke—Lakeshore

Toronto—Lakeshore

Lakeshore

See also
 List of Canadian federal electoral districts
 Past Canadian electoral districts

References

Federal riding history from the Library of Parliament:
Lakeshore 
Toronto—Lakeshore
Etobicoke—Lakeshore 
2011 Results from Elections Canada
 Campaign expense data from Elections Canada

Notes

Etobicoke
Federal electoral districts of Toronto
Ontario federal electoral districts
1976 establishments in Ontario
1966 establishments in Ontario
1976 disestablishments in Ontario